George Lincoln Barker (born August 24, 1951) is an American politician of the Democratic Party from the Commonwealth of Virginia. He currently serves in the Senate of Virginia, representing the 39th district, made up of parts of Fairfax and Prince William counties, plus part of the City of Alexandria. He was first elected in November 2007.

Career
Barker attended Harvard University, where he received an A.B. degree in Economics and Public Health and an M.S. degree in Health Policy and Management. He began a career in health systems planning with the Health Care Agency of Northern Virginia in the mid-1970s.

In 1990 Barker became the chair of the newly formed Northern Virginia Perinatal Council. The following year, he became president of his homeowner's association. In 2001, he was appointed chair of the Fairfax County Transportation Advisory Commission.

As vice-chair of the Tysons Task Force, Senator Barker worked to improve transportation conditions and helped to re-design Tysons Corner. He has also chaired several other state, county, and regional organizations related to health care, human resources, and transportation.

Over the years, Barker has hosted two shows on Fairfax Public Access Television, Focus on Franconia and Spotlight on Springfield.

Outside of his legislative duties, Barker serves as the current Executive Director of the Greater Prince William County Health Center.

Virginia State Senate

2007 election
Barker announced his candidacy in 2007 against incumbent Republican Jay O'Brien, who represented the 39th District, located in Fairfax County. On June 12, Barker defeated Greg J. Galligan in the Democratic primary, 2,585 to 1,641.

O'Brien said that illegal immigration was one of the biggest issues of concern to district voters, proposing aggressive crackdowns. Barker said that voters in the district were more interested in issues such as transportation funding. Barker defeated O'Brien in the general election on November 6, receiving 19,282 votes to O'Brien's 19,131.

2008-2011 legislative sessions 
In June 2011, the Fairfax Connection said that in the Senate, "Barker has been one of the most successful members in terms of getting legislation through the General Assembly. In the most recent session, for example, he was one of two members who were able to get 20 bills or more to the governor’s desk."

2011 election 
In early 2010, O'Brien announced that he intended to run for the seat he had lost in 2007.  Scott Martin, an assistant dean at George Mason University who ran unsuccessfully for a Fairfax County School Board seat in 2003, also announced he planned to seek the Republican nomination. As of June 2011, O'Brien was no longer running, and Martin had been joined by two other Republican candidates, former Justice Department official Miller Baker and special-education assistant Andre Muange. Muange also dropped out, and Baker defeated Martin 73%-27% in the August 23, 2011 primary.

The Barker-Baker contest was expected to be very close. The total spending for the two campaigns was $1.7 million, the seventh-highest among the 40 Senate contests. Barker won with over 53% of the vote.

2012-2015 legislative sessions 
In July 2014, Barker, arguing for Medicaid expansion in Virginia, said that uncompensated care has "gone down by 30 percent just in the first few months" of Medicaid expansions in the states that adopted it. PolitiFact Virginia evaluated the claim, rating it "True"; it was the top-read Virginia Truth-O-Meter story of 2014.

Barker was the sponsor of SB1122, passed in 2015, that requires Virginia colleges to immediately notify parents and proactively handle suicide risks on campus with a coordinated support network involving the student, friends, health or counseling centers on campus, and parents. Barker worked on similar bills for several previous years.

2015 election 
Joe Murray, a Republican, challenged Barker in the November 2015 election. Spending on the election exceeded over half a million dollars. Barker won the election 53.75% to 46.02% for Murray.

2019 election 
Republican Dutch Hillenburg ran against Barker in the 2019 election. Barker held his seat against Hillenburg, getting 65.9% of the vote.

Personal 
Barker is a Presbyterian. He and his wife, Jane, have two children, Erik and Emily. He was PTA president at both Robinson Secondary School (1992–94) and Mount Vernon High School (2000–01). He and his wife currently live in Clifton, in Fairfax County.

References

External links
Senate of Virginia profile
Constituent/campaign website
Project Vote Smart - profile
Virginia Public Access Project information

1951 births
Living people
Democratic Party Virginia state senators
Harvard School of Public Health alumni
People from Clifton, Virginia
People from Eldorado, Illinois
American television personalities
Male television personalities
American Presbyterians
21st-century American politicians